
Vasculogenic mimicry is the formation of microvascular channels by aggressive, metastatic and genetically deregulated tumour cells. This process differs from angiogenesis in that it occurs de novo without the presence of endothelial cells (tumour cells line tumour vessels effectively mimicking a true vascular endothelium). It was first described in uveal melanomas by Maniotis et al. in 1999. There are two main types of vasculogenic mimicry: tubular and patterned. The former is morphologically similar to normal blood vessels, whereas the latter is visibly different although capable of undergoing anastomosis with blood vessels.

The microvasculature generated through vasculogenic mimicry contains a basement membrane that stains positive with periodic acid–Schiff stain.

History 
After its discovery in 1999 a controversy arose in the field regarding the validity of the findings and conclusions of Maniotis and colleagues. Nonetheless, their findings have been further supported by several research groups, becoming the focus of much interest due to its potential role as a therapeutic target and indicator of metastasis.

See also 
Vasculogenesis

References

Further reading 
Milosevic, V., Edelmann, R.J., Fosse, J.H., Östman, A., Akslen, L.A. (2022).  Molecular Phenotypes of Endothelial Cells in Malignant Tumors. In: Akslen, L.A., Watnick, R.S. (eds) Biomarkers of the Tumor Microenvironment. Springer, Cham. https://doi.org/10.1007/978-3-030-98950-7_3

Cancer
Angiology